The seventh season of the American television comedy series The Goldbergs premiered on ABC on September 25, 2019. The season concluded on May 13, 2020 and consists of 23 episodes.

Production on the 24th episode was halted as a result of the COVID-19 pandemic, resulting in only 23 episodes being completed and aired. The planned 24th episode, which focuses on the wedding of Bill Lewis and his girlfriend, ended up being produced during season 8.

Cast

Main cast
Wendi McLendon-Covey as Beverly Goldberg
Sean Giambrone as Adam Goldberg
Troy Gentile as Barry Goldberg
Hayley Orrantia as Erica Goldberg
Sam Lerner as Geoff Schwartz
George Segal as Albert "Pops" Solomon
Jeff Garlin as Murray Goldberg

Recurring cast
Kelli Berglund as Ren
Natalie Alyn Lind as Dana Caldwell
AJ Michalka as Lainey Lewis
Matt Bush as Andy Cogan
Noah Munck as Naked Rob
Shayne Topp as Matt Bradley
Alex Jennings as Carla
Sean Marquette as Johnny Atkins
Sadie Stanley as Brea Bee

Episodes

Ratings

References

The Goldbergs (2013 TV series) seasons
2019 American television seasons
2020 American television seasons
Television productions suspended due to the COVID-19 pandemic